The Brunnbach  is a river of Tyrol, Austra, in the protected landscape Hefferthorn-Fellhorn-Sonnenberg.

Course

The stream is fed by tributaries from the rifts of the Einfangalm, Hackalm, Martenalm and Weissensteinalm. (Alm: German for Alpine pasture). In a last waterfall above the Bäckenalm, the water again rushes down and collects itself in a lagoon-like basin. In the valley Hagertal between Kössen and Kirchdorf in Tirol, after  it reaches as right tributary the Großache.

Special feature
The distinctiveness of this river is the naturalness of its meandering course and its natural shore vegetation. After strong rainfalls, the body swells rapidly and passes over the shores, but flows through the meanders at low speed. Therefore, here the typical fertile wetlands are formed.

Rivers of Tyrol (state)
Rivers of Austria